What Ifs & Maybes is the third studio album by British singer-songwriter Tom Grennan. It is scheduled to be released on 9 June 2023. Grennan began recording the album in April 2021 and finished in July 2022, during which time he collaborated with musicians including Jamie Scott, LostBoy and The Six. The album was preceded by the singles "Remind Me", "All These Nights", "You Are Not Alone" and "Here", and will be supported by a UK arena tour beginning in March 2023.

Background and promotion
In May 2021, Grennan revealed in an interview with Fleur East that he was already in the studio writing material for his third album with Jamie Scott, Mike Needle and LostBoy, despite it being only months after releasing his second album Evering Road. He said "I'm writing and riding the wave that I'm on at the moment. It's been a pretty crazy few months from getting a Number 1 [album] to 'Little Bit of Love' blowing up. I think I'm in the eye of the storm." Towards the end of 2021, Grennan began writing songs for others, which began with Westlife's single "Starlight".

Upon the release of the album's second single "All These Nights" being released, which was produced by songwriting collective The Six, Grennan expressed how the song was a teaser for the sound of his third album. On Nick Grimshaw's new podcast "Dish", he stated, "I went away to the countryside and had two weeks away and we would just write. And it came about three in the morning where we were just like, we need excitement. No one needs another bloody ballad in their lives. Do you know what I mean? No way. For me, I was like, I want to have fun and I want to change up my sound. I feel like this whole new record, especially with "All These Nights", is the start where I'm introducing people to my new sound. So, it's exciting, it's fun, it's up-tempo and it just feels like, a different me and I'm excited. Some people might not like it, some people will hopefully love it. But we'll see where it goes." He also said that the album was mostly finished and that his current partner Daniella Carraturo had been the inspiration behind the majority of the songs.

During the latter half of 2022, Grennan took part in two collaborations, being KSI's "Not Over Yet" and Joel Corry's "Lionheart (Fearless)", which were both revealed later to be on the Apple Music edition of the album. The latter became the England football team's anthem during the 2022 FIFA World Cup. Amongst the collaborations, Grennan announced the album title as What Ifs & Maybes along with a UK arena tour, beginning in March 2023, which he stated is his biggest tour in his career to date. He described the album, in reference to its title, as about "going with your gut, not your head, because you never know what's going to happen". In January 2023, upon the album's fourth single "Here" being released, the album became available for pre-order on CD, vinyl and cassette formats through his official website.

Track listing

Notes
  signifies a miscellaneous producer
  signifies a vocal producer

References

2023 albums
Tom Grennan albums
Upcoming albums